Dragoljub Anđelković (born 14 April 1993) is a Serbian football forward, who plays for Swedish club KSF Prespa Birlik.

Club career

Sloga Kraljevo

2010–11 season
Born in Kraljevo, Anđelković passed Sloga Kraljevo youth categories. After good games and efficiency, he received the jersey of the first team early. In his debut season for the first team, he made 18 league appearances, and with 4 goals contributed to Sloga's returning to the Serbian First League. He was also sitting on the bench in the Serbian Cup match against Red Star Belgrade, but did not join the game.

2011–12 season
In the 2012–13 season, Anđelković also played for the youth team, and he often led the team as a captain. In the first half of season he didn't play a lot of for the senior team, but in the second, he was a first reserve for Darko Drinić. Anđelković started 3 matches, and played total 22 games, without goals.

2012–13 season
After Drinić's departure, Anđelković took jersey number 9 and started the season as a first choice in attack. But shortly, a footballer with more experience, Jovan Jovanović, arrived in Sloga, and Anđelković moved on to right-wing. He spent the season mainly at that position, but participated as a second striker, and he was one of the most effective players after Jovan Jovanović. He scored 7 goals and contributed to Sloga's staying in the league. He played on 26 league and 1 cup match.

2013–14 season
Sloga started the season with players from last season, and one new player, Nemanja Lekanić, but added one more forward, Velimir Stanković from the second fixture. In the first half of the season Sloga made all 7 home wins, and took 5 points when away. Anđelković made 4 points directly, scoring a goal against BSK Borča in an away draw, and a home win versus Sinđelić Beograd. He scored that goal after a failed cross pass; the ball tricked goalkeeper Bubonja and entered into the goal. That was a very successful autumn for Sloga, but 4 forwards scored a total of 6 goals. Anđelković scored 2 goals, Stanković too, Nikola Radović scored 1 and Ivan Ćuković scored 1 goal. Sloga added a new forward, Milan Jovanović, for the second half of the season, and some fixtures after beginning the spring part of the championship. Anđelković dropped into the background; he was sitting on the bench in some matches, 5 times he entered the game, and he returned to the starting 11 until the end of season. He ended the season with 24 league appearances and 2 goals. He also played in the cup match against Vojvodina.

2014–15 season

Loan to Voždovac
After Sloga's permission for all players to leave the club, Anđelković moved to Voždovac on loan along with Zoran Marušić. He had earned the right to play in the 3rd fixture against Rad. Anđelković scored the only goal for Voždovac on his Jelen SuperLiga debut in a debacle match 1–6 against Rad. He was the first player of Voždovac to respond to the Ice Bucket Challenge.

Return to Sloga Kraljevo
Anđelković and Marušić returned to Sloga in January 2015. Although Sloga was relegated to Serbian League West, Anđelković may have had his best half-season playing for Sloga. He played 14 matches in the league and scored a total of 7 goals: 4 at home, against Javor in the 16th, Kolubara in the 20th, Proleter in the 27th, and Sinđelić in the 29th fixture, and 3 away goals including 2 against Sloga Petrovac in the 26th, and 1 against Jedinstvo Putevi in the 28th fixture.

OFK Petrovac / Sloga Petrovac
After Sloga Kraljevo relegated from the Serbian First League, Anđelković moved in Montenegrin First League side OFK Petrovac. After he scored 3 goals on 10 matches during the first half of 2015–16 season, Dragoljub returned in Serbia and joined Sloga Petrovac. He made 6 First League appearances for the spring half-season, mostly as a back-up player. After the club dissolved in summer 2016, Anđelković left as a free agent.

Borac Čačak
In summer 2016, Anđelković joined Borac Čačak. After pre-season period, he signed two-and-a-half year deal with the club. He made his official debut for new club in second fixture match of the 2016–17 Serbian SuperLiga season, replacing Marko Zoćević in second half of a match against Mladost Lučani, played on 30 July 2016.

Career statistics

References

External links
 Dragoljub Anđelković stats at utakmica.rs
 
 
 Dragoljub Anđelković at SvFF

1993 births
Living people
Serbian expatriate footballers
Sportspeople from Kraljevo
Association football forwards
Serbian footballers
FK Sloga Kraljevo players
FK Voždovac players
Serbian First League players
Serbian SuperLiga players
Montenegrin First League players
OFK Petrovac players
FK Sloga Petrovac na Mlavi players
FK Borac Čačak players
RFK Grafičar Beograd players
Żejtun Corinthians F.C. players
KSF Prespa Birlik players
Expatriate footballers in Montenegro
Serbian expatriate sportspeople in Montenegro
Expatriate footballers in Malta
Serbian expatriate sportspeople in Malta
Expatriate footballers in Sweden
Serbian expatriate sportspeople in Sweden